A Gal Named Jo was an album by Jo Stafford, released in 1956 by Columbia Records. Stafford's husband, Paul Weston, serves as conductor and arranger.

Track listing

Side one
 "Easy Come, Easy Go"
 "Little Man with a Candy Cigar"
 "Taking a Chance on Love"

Side two
 "Dancing on the Ceiling"
  "Mountain High, Valley Low"
 "Don't Get Around Much Anymore" - 3:12

Personnel 

Jo Stafford – vocals

References

1956 albums
Jo Stafford albums
Columbia Records albums
Albums arranged by Paul Weston
Albums conducted by Paul Weston